The 2016–17 Illinois Fighting Illini men's basketball team represented the University of Illinois at Urbana–Champaign in the 2016–17 NCAA Division I men's basketball season. Led by fifth-year head coach John Groce, the Illini played their home games at State Farm Center as members of the Big Ten Conference. They finished the season 20–15, 8–10 in Big Ten play to finish in ninth place. They lost in the second round of the Big Ten tournament to Michigan. They received an invitation to the National Invitation Tournament where they defeated Valparaiso and Boise State before losing in the Quarterfinals to UCF.

On March 11, 2017, Illinois fired head coach John Groce. Shortly thereafter, the school announced that Assistant coach Jamall Walker would coach the team in the NIT. On March 18, the school hired Brad Underwood as the new head coach.

Previous season
The Fighting Illini finished the 2015–16 season with a record of 15–19, 5–13 in Big Ten play to finish in 12th place in conference. The Illini defeated Minnesota and Iowa to advance to the quarterfinals of the Big Ten tournament where they lost to Purdue.

Offseason

Departures

2016 recruiting class
On September 16, 2015, Te'Jon Lucas of Milwaukee, Wisconsin verbally committed to attend Illinois in the fall of 2016 and signed his National Letter of Intent to finalize his recruitment on November 11, 2015. Lucas attended the NBA Top 100 camp in June 2015, had scholarship offers from California, Memphis, Purdue, and Wisconsin, and he strongly considered both USC and Old Dominion before committing to Illinois. Lucas is only the third player from the State of Wisconsin to commit to Illinois, and is the first since 1926.

Incoming transfers

2017 Recruiting class
During Illinois' final home game against Minnesota on February 28, 2016, Da'Monte Williams verbally committed to attend Illinois in the fall of 2017. Williams is the son of former Illinois guard Frank Williams  who led the Fighting Illini to three straight NCAA men's basketball tournament appearances, including an Elite Eight appearance in 2001. On November 9, 2016 Trent Frazier signed a national letter of intent after considering Memphis, Georgia, Kansas State and Seton Hall, among others. On April 26, 2017, Mark Smith signed a national letter of intent committing to the University of Illinois.

On January 16, 2016, three-star shooting guard Javon Pickett of Belleville, Illinois verbally committed to attend Illinois in the fall of 2017. After the firing of John Groce, Pickett asked for and received a release of his letter of intent to Illinois. On November 17, 2016, four-star recruit Jeremiah Tilmon announced that he had signed his letter of intent with Illinois the  previous day, after a week of press uncertainty. However, after the coaching change at Illinois, Tilmon requested and received a release of his letter of intent with the school.

Roster

Schedule and results

|-
!colspan=12 style="background:#; color:#;"| Exhibition

|-
!colspan=12 style="background:#; color:#;"| Non-conference regular season

|-
!colspan=12 style="background:#; color:#;"| Big Ten regular season

|-
!colspan=12 style="background:#; color:#;"| Big Ten tournament

|-
!colspan=12 style="background:#; color:#;"| NIT

References

Illinois
Illinois Fighting Illini men's basketball seasons
Illinois
Illinois Fighting Illini men's b
Illinois Fighting Illini men's b